Qarabağlı (also, Karabagly) is a village and municipality in the Khachmaz Rayon of Azerbaijan.  It has a population of 409.

References 

Populated places in Khachmaz District